Events from the year 1987 in Portuguese Macau.

Incumbents
 Governor - Joaquim Pinto Correia, Carlos Montez Melancia

Events

December
 22 December - The establishment of Macau Olympic Committee.

References

 
Years of the 20th century in Macau
Macau
Macau
1980s in Macau